Thelonius Bair (born August 27, 1999) is a Canadian professional soccer player who plays as a forward for Scottish Premiership club St Johnstone.

Club career

Youth
Bair started his youth career with Ottawa Royals, before joining Capital United FC and West Ottawa SC before his move to Vancouver.

Vancouver Whitecaps FC
On July 24, 2018, Vancouver Whitecaps FC announced that it would be signing Bair to a multi-year MLS homegrown pre-contract beginning in 2019. Bair made his Whitecaps FC and MLS debut on matchday 15 of the 2019 MLS season, coming off the bench in the 71st minute in a 2–1 home victory against FC Dallas. On August 11 against the Portland Timbers, He scored his first professional goal.

On August 6, 2021, Bair was loaned to Norwegian club HamKam for the remainder of the 2021 season. In his first appearance on August 18, Bair scored a goal in a 2–0 victory over Jerv. Bair would go on to make 17 appearances in the 1. divisjon, scoring 4 goals as HamKam were crowned champions and gained promotion to the 2022 Eliteserien. In December 2021, upon his return to Vancouver, the Whitecaps announced they had exercised Bair's contract option, keeping him at the club through 2022.

St Johnstone
In January 2022, Bair was transferred to Scottish Premiership club St Johnstone for an undisclosed fee on a contract through the end of the 2023-24 season. He made his debut on February 9 against St Mirren. Bair scored his first goal for the club against Kilmarnock on October 5, 2022.

International career

Youth
In 2018, Bair represented Canada at the U21 level at the 2018 Toulon Tournament. He subsequently played for the Canadian U20 team at the 2018 CONCACAF U-20 Championship and, scoring a goal and two assists in five appearances. Bair was named to the Canadian U-23 provisional roster for the 2020 CONCACAF Men's Olympic Qualifying Championship on February 26, 2020, and was named to the final squad ahead of the rescheduled tournament on March 10, 2021.

Senior
In January 2020, Bair was called up to the Canadian senior team ahead of friendlies against Barbados and Iceland. He made his debut on January 7 in the first match against Barbados, and scored a goal in a 4–1 victory.

International goals
Scores and results list Canada's goal tally first.

Career statistics

Club

International

References

External links

1999 births
Living people
Association football forwards
Canadian soccer players
Black Canadian soccer players
Canadian people of Jamaican descent
Soccer players from Ottawa
Vancouver Whitecaps FC players
Hamarkameratene players
St Johnstone F.C. players
Major League Soccer players
Norwegian First Division players
Canada men's youth international soccer players
Canada men's international soccer players
Homegrown Players (MLS)
Canadian expatriate soccer players
Expatriate footballers in Norway
Canadian expatriate sportspeople in Norway
West Ottawa SC players